The men's 200 metre breaststroke event at the 2004 Olympic Games was contested at the Olympic Aquatic Centre of the Athens Olympic Sports Complex in Athens, Greece on August 17 and 18.

After missing out the semifinals in Sydney four years earlier, Japan's Kosuke Kitajima blasted one of the longest Olympic swimming records in the book, when he clocked at 2:09.44 to erase a 0.77-second mark by American swimmer Mike Barrowman in 1992, and to strike a breaststroke double for the second straight time. 15-year-old Dániel Gyurta of Hungary made a surprise packet with a silver medal in 2:10.80, edging out U.S. swimmer Brendan Hansen in a close race by 0.07 of a second. Hansen, who broke Kitajima's world record at the U.S. Olympic trials one month ago, finished third in 2:10.87.

Records
Prior to this competition, the existing world and Olympic records were as follows.

The following new world and Olympic records were set during this competition.

Results

Heats

Semifinals

Semifinal 1

Semifinal 2

Final

References

External links
Official Olympic Report

M
Men's events at the 2004 Summer Olympics